Engle is an unincorporated community in Sierra County, New Mexico.

Engle was a station on the Atchison, Topeka and Santa Fe Railway and New Mexico State Road 51 passes through the community. Elephant Butte Reservoir and Truth or Consequences lie to the west and the San Andres Mountains are to the east.

History
El Camino Real de Tierra Adentro passed through the vicinity of Engle; two former segments of the road near Engle are listed on the National Register of Historic Places.  West of Engle is Engle Lake originally known as the Laguna del Muerto (Lake of the Dead Man).  It was a paraje, one of the few along this route through the Jornada del Muerto with reliable seasonal water and grass that grew on the lake bottom following the retreating waters of the evaporating lake.  If the lake was dry, stock had to be driven to water at the spring Ojo del Muerto, six miles west in the Fra Cristobal Range.

Education
Truth or Consequences Municipal Schools is the school district for the entire county. Truth or Consequences Middle School and Hot Springs High School, both in Truth or Consequences, are the district's secondary schools.

Notable person
 Rudd Weatherwax, actor, was born in Engle.

References

External links

Unincorporated communities in Sierra County, New Mexico
Unincorporated communities in New Mexico